Nirmal Prabha Bordoloi (1932/1933 – 1 June 2004) was an Indian poet, lyricist and folklorist associated with Assamese literature. She was president of the Asam Sahitya Sabha in 1991 held at Dudhnoi in Goalpara district. She received several awards including Sahitya Akademi Award in 1983 for her poetry book Sudirgha Din Aru Ritu, the President's Award in 1957 for children's literature and the Asam Sahitya Sabha award twice in 1977 and 1989 for her non-fiction books 'Dinar Pisat Din' and 'Debi', respectively. She was conferred the 'Saraswati Sanman' title in 1987.

Life and career
Bordoloi was married as a child at the age of 11. She wrote over 54 Assamese and English books and numerous songs. Notable among these are Kabita: Bon Faringar Rong, Samipesu, Antarang, Asamar Luko Sangonskriti, Siba, Asamar Luko Kabita.

Her first collection of poems was 'Bon Faringar Rang'. 

Some other collection of poems : 

Dinor Pasot Din 

Samipehu

Antaranga 

Sudirgha Din Aru Ritu 

Song collections :

Xunboroniya Aai 

Xuriya Geet 

Other literary works:

Devi 

Shiva 

Surjya

She died on 1 June 2004 at the age of 71.

See also
 Assamese literature
 List of people from Assam
 List of Asam Sahitya Sabha presidents
 List of Assamese writers with their pen names
 List of Sahitya Akademi Award winners for Assamese

References

External links
 An interview with the author at bipuljyoti.in.

1930s births
2004 deaths
Assamese-language poets
Asom Sahitya Sabha Presidents
Poets from Assam
Recipients of the Sahitya Akademi Award in Assamese
Indian women poets
20th-century Indian poets
20th-century Indian women writers
Women writers from Assam